Sharon Gamboa Cuneta-Pangilinan (born January 6, 1966) is a Filipina actress, singer, television host, and socialite. Regarded as one of the most successful and highest-earning individuals in the Philippine entertainment industry, she has grown into a household name and has been referred to as the "Megastar". Cuneta has starred in over 60 films, hosted over 10 television shows, and recorded over 40 albums. She has held numerous accolades as an actress, host, and recording artist, including multiple FAMAS, MMFF, and Awit Awards, the Philippine music industry equivalent of the Grammy Award.

Cuneta has judged several televised singing competitions, including Star Power: Sharon's Search for the Next Female Pop Superstar, Your Face Sounds Familiar, Your Face Sounds Familiar: Kids and as a coach in ABS-CBN's The Voice Kids Philippines and The Voice Teens Philippines.

Early life
Sharon Gamboa Cuneta was born on January 6, 1966, at Our Lady of Lourdes Hospital, Santa Mesa, Manila, to Pablo Cuneta (1910–2000), a former Mayor of Pasay who was the longest-serving mayor in the Philippines from 1951 to 1998, and Elaine Gamboa (1934–2014), the sister of actress and singer Helen Gamboa. Her early years were spent in San Lorenzo Village, Makati and then in their family home in Paraiso Street Dasmariñas Village, Makati.

Cuneta grew up listening to her dad's record collection. Her mother, Elaine Gamboa, was a Piano Major at the UST's Conservatory of Music in her youth, the young Sha-Sha would take up piano, guitar, flute and piano lessons to broaden her musical training and exposure at a young age. At the age of three, Cuneta would accompany her famous Aunt Helen Gamboa during tapings of her television shows.

Another of her first proper TV appearances was on Ike Lozada's show, for the "Bulilit" portion, where she mimicked the songs of her aunt, Helen Gamboa. Cuneta was just as young when she appeared in her first movie, the Rosanna Ortiz – George Estregan starrer Lovers for Hire where she played one of Roderick Paulate's playmates.

Cuneta attended St. Paul College, Pasig and International School Manila for her primary to secondary education.

Career

1978–1980: career beginnings
In January 1978, 12-year old Sharon Gamboa Cuneta made her first visit to 782 Aurora Boulevard, which was the address of Vicor Records. Her Uncle and Vice-President of Vicor, Tito Sotto, asked her to record “Tawag Ng Pag-Ibig” which he produced for her at Vicor and shortly after, she was on television promoting her own song for the first time and on the TV show Discorama hosted by TVJ.

The young Sharon was being interviewed live on Discorama, where she stated: "This is the show I watch every week. This is the show that I don’t know how many hundreds of thousands or millions of people watch in the whole country. When it hit me, I couldn’t talk."

In May 1978, Sharon Cuneta followed up with a song by Rey Valera entitled "Mr. DJ". Her producer in Vicor, Tito Sotto, wanted Valera to make a song that would appeal to the Radio DJ's and convince them to play her record on the air.

"Mr. DJ" became a popular hit and gave Cuneta the moniker, "DJ's Pet" (which also became the title of her debut LP). Cuneta received her first Gold Record for this and her music label Vicor Records came out with succeeding albums like "Sharon" and "Sharon Cuneta", and then "High School" with the same level of success.

Cuneta released further popular singles including "Naaalala Ka", "I-Swing Mo Ako", "Kahit Maputi Na Ang Buhok Ko" and "High School Life", which were also part of the Manila Sound era.

Aside from her recording career, Cuneta also began hosting with her aunt, Helen Gamboa, in a TV variety show titled C.U.T.E. or Call Us Two for Entertainment on IBC 13.

In 1980, because of her commercial success as a young singer, Cuneta's boss at the time in Vicor Music, Boss Vic Del Rosario, gave her the golden opportunity to record her very first George Canseco song "Tubig at Langis". This became the theme song of the film with same title starring Vilma Santos and directed by Danny Zialcita.

During the Cebu Film Festival that same year, "Langis at Tubig" was an official entry and had a float made for the parade at the Sinulog Festival. The only people there were the director, Danny Zialcita and Sining Silangan producer, Ernie Rojas. But there were no actors from the actual movie who were able to go to Cebu for this event as the main lead, Vilma Santos, was pregnant at the time. Sining Silangan asked permission from Boss Vic Del Rosario if the young Sharon Cuneta who sang the theme song could join them on the float. Boss Vic agreed and Cuneta, accompanied by her Mother, Elaine Cuneta, headed to Cebu. "My Mom and I got on the float. We went to Cebu, my first time ever. When I got on the float and it started moving, I couldn’t believe how people reacted to me. That they knew me. I just felt all this love come towards me like a rain of bullets. I can’t explain the feeling. At that age, I was 14 already. A veteran (laughs) after 2 years of singing."

1981–1984: Dear Heart and the start of a movie career
On the same day as the Sinulog Festival Float Ride during the Cebu Film Festival, Director Danny Zialcita asked Cuneta to appear in an upcoming film. Her parents eventually agreed to meet with Danny Zialcita. Despite asking for an outlandishly large fee, Silangan agreed to pay the sum without reservation. "Ok po. Call". That was it. Zialcita told her: "If you would do this for me I will make you a star. It was a commitment, a promise I made to her." "The topic of the leading man came up. Direk Danny said, 'Who would you want to be your leading man?' And my answer, of all things to say, was anybody but Gabby Concepcion. Turns out, the only one available was Gabby Concepcion."

Cuneta starred in her very first feature film, Dear Heart. She was paired with then Close-Up model and Regal Films' 1980s heartthrob, Gabby Concepcion. Dear Heart was successful and paved the way for future collaborations.

Due to the commercial success of Dear Heart, a sequel was made. Since Sining Silangan didn't have the means to create an immediate follow up film, Mayor Pablo Cuneta collaborated with Vic Del Rosario and established Viva Films. On November 12, 1981, Viva Films released its first feature film, P.S. I Love You, starring Cuneta and Concepcion. The film was a box office success and was followed by another Sharon-Gabby collaboration, My Only Love (1982).

Cuneta was also paired with other leading men, with the likes of William Martinez (in Forgive and Forget), Rowell Santiago (in Cross My Heart and Friends in Love) and Miguel Rodriguez (in To Love Again) from 1982 to 1983, which made her the Ms. RP Movies for the years mentioned.

Cuneta top billed three blockbuster melodramas in 1984: Sa Hirap at Ginhawa, Bukas, Luluhod And Mga Tala, and Dapat Ka Bang Mahalin? that led to her eventual crowning as 1984's Box Office Queen of RP Movies.

Cuneta also staged a two-night sold-out major concert at the Araneta Coliseum titled Sharon Solo with the Boys on July 20 and 21, 1984, and was cited as the year's Most Outstanding Female Concert Hall Act by Aliw Awards.

1985–1989: 'Megastar' and The Sharon Cuneta Show
In 1985, a pet project of the late Mina Aragon-del Rosario, Bituing Walang Ningning was made into a film by Viva Films starring Cuneta, Christopher de Leon and Cherie Gil. The film was released on Valentine's Day, 1985, and was a box office success, crowning Cuneta once again as 1985's Box Office Queen of RP Movies and "Bida sa Takilya", the latter given at the 1986 FAMAS Awards. The moniker "Megastar" was also given to her by the press during that year because of her continuous success in the box office.

Cuneta was also awarded Best Actress by FAMAS for her performance in the 1984 film Dapat Ka Bang Mahalin and by the Film Academy of the Philippines for Sa Hirap at Ginhawa]. In 1986, Cuneta's string of hit movies continued as she stars on three major movies: Nakagapos Na Puso (with Lorna Tolentino), Captain Barbell (where she played a cameo role as Darna) and Sana'y Wala Nang Wakas (with Cherie Gil and Dina Bonnevie), the latter seeing her again awarded the 1986 Box Office Queen of RP Movies.

Her first solo musical-variety show, The Sharon Cuneta Show, also premiered in September 1986 on IBC, which also went on to be one of the longest running musical-variety shows in Philippine television.

While filming her first feature film Dear Heart (1981), Cuneta began dating her on-screen partner Gabby Concepcion and the two continued co-starring in films like P.S. I Love You (1981) and Dapat Ka Bang Mahalin? (lit. Shall You Be Loved?) (1984).

After her short-lived marriage with Concepcion, Cuneta worked with National Artist for Film, Lino Brocka, for the first time via the film Pasan Ko Ang Daigdig. The film did not fare well at the box office; however, it earned Cuneta another Best Actress nomination from FAMAS. In 1988, Cuneta only did two films, Jack 'n Jill Sa Amerika and Buy One, Take One, both receiving lukewarm response from the public. Cuneta's variety show was moved from IBC to ABS-CBN on March 6, 1988.

Cuneta continued touring abroad with "The Sharon Cuneta US Concert Tour '88" and was given a Plaque of Welcome and Appreciation from Los Angeles Mayor Tom Bradley at her show at the Los Angeles Shrine Auditorium. In 1989, Cuneta worked with Lino Brocka once again in two movies, 3 Mukha Ng Pag-ibig and Babangon Ako't Dudurugin Kita, the latter giving her another Best Actress nomination from FAMAS and the Film Academy of the Philippines.

1990–1995: box-office hall of fame
Cuneta's box office success continued with roles alongside popular action stars like Fernando Poe Jr. (Kahit Konting Pagtingin-1990) Robin Padilla ,(Maging Sino Ka Man-1991), Ramon 'Bong' Revilla Jr. (Pangako Sa 'Yo-1992), Rudy Fernandez (Kung Kailangan Mo Ako-1993). All those movies were certified blockbusters, that though she was already elevated to Hall of Fame as Box-Office Queen in 1990, she was crowned again in 1991 through 1993 because of the success of her movies.

Cuneta also reconciled with estranged husband, Gabby Concepcion, in three more films, Bakit Ikaw Pa Rin? (1990), Una Kang Naging Akin (1991) and Tayong Dalawa (1992), the latter giving her a grandslam Best Actress nomination from PMPC Star Awards for Movies, FAMAS, Film Academy of the Philippines and Gawad Urian. Cuneta won a Platinum award in 1992, Double Platinum award in 1991 and 1992, and Triple Platinum award in 1992.

In 1992, Cuneta reunited with former flame, Richard Gomez in the film Ngayon at Kailanman and in 1994 with Kapantay Ay Langit.

1996: 'Madrasta', second marriage and hiatus
For the first time, in 1996, Cuneta made a film outside her mother studio Viva Films via the film Madrasta from Star Cinema. This film garnered her Best Actress Awards from all major award-giving bodies in the Philippines, hence a Grandslam win for her outstanding performance in the film. Cuneta became one of the few actresses (along with Vilma Santos, Nora Aunor, and Lorna Tolentino) to be given a grand slam best actress award in Philippine Cinema.

2000–2011: Multi-media era
In 2000, Cuneta filmed Minsan Minahal Kita alongside Richard Gomez, which earned P10 million on its opening day.

She was named Best Actress during the 2002 Manila Film Festival in June for her role in Viva Films' Magkapatid. In the same month she was given a civic award by the City of Manila the Patnubay ng Sining at Kalinwigan for cinema. Other list of awardees included the likes of Raul Locsin for architecture, Agnes Arellano for sculpture and the late Santiago Bose for new art form.

She did not make any films from 2004 through 2007 as she concentrated her career more on television and music. In 2006, she released a studio album, Isn't it Romantic, which was awarded with a Diamond certification (sold over 250,000 units in the Philippines).

On January 6, 2006, Cuneta returned to television from her maternity leave with a 40th birthday celebration on ABS-CBN's Ang Pagbabalik Ng Bituin (The Return of the Star). The following month, she came back to her musical talk show, Sharon. After a long rest from filmmaking, she made another film, Caregiver, in 2008, which, according to ABS-CBN, is their most expensive film. In this film, Cuneta played the role of a school teacher working abroad as a caregiver. The film was the fifth highest-grossing film of 2008.

In 2009, Cuneta starred in BFF: Best Friends Forever with Ai-Ai delas Alas and for the first time in her 30 years, a film with Regal Entertainment via Mano Po 6 (which later on gave her another Best Actress citation at the 2009 Metro Manila Film Festival). On January 12, 2010, coinciding with her annual birthday show, she launched her eponymous magazine Sharon at Home.

Her long-running musical talk show, Sharon, ended on October 3, 2010, and was replaced by a talent show (which she also hosted), Star Power with singers Christian Bautista and Erik Santos as her co-hosts. After Star Power, Cuneta hosted the Philippine franchise of the popular US reality show, The Biggest Loser Pinoy Edition on May 30, 2011, which she co-hosted.

2011–2013: transfer to TV5
On November 22, 2011, Cuneta left ABS-CBN, her home network of 23 years, and signed a five-year contract with TV5. The contract was rumored to be worth one billion pesos, according to celebrity tweets in microblogging site Twitter, which is the biggest talent fee ever of any local artist in the Philippine showbiz history.

In 2012, Cuneta started her first talk show under her new network, Sharon: Kasama Mo, Kapatid. The show ran for eight months.

In September 2013, Cuneta became a co-host of musical variety talk show The Mega and the Songwriter alongside Ogie Alcasid. Cuneta's comedy series, Madam chairman, premiered on October 14. It was her first TV series in 35 years. It revolves around a barangay chairwoman and her struggles in dividing her role as a mother and as a public official.

2014–present: departure from TV5 and return to ABS-CBN
In September 2014, Cuneta announced through Facebook and Twitter that she had pre-terminated her five-year contract with TV5 and was a freelancer. In March 2015, she signed a contract with ABS-CBN, marking her return to her home network of 23 years, saying: "It is overwhelmingly wonderful! There's really no place like home. I don't belong to anywhere else, and now I'm back home, safe and sound." Upon returning, she also announced that her first project in the channel would be as a judge in Your Face Sounds Familiar. In an interview on May 2, 2016, on TV Patrol, she stated that she will serve as one of the three coaches (judges) for the third season of The Voice Kids, replacing Sarah Geronimo who earlier this year confirmed her departure from the show. She also became one of the coaches for the first season of The Voice Teens.

Personal life
While filming her first feature film Dear Heart (1981), Cuneta began dating her on-screen partner Gabby Concepcion and the two continued co-starring in films like P.S. I Love You (1981) and Dapat Ka Bang Mahalin? (1984). The two married on September 23, 1984, at Manila Cathedral. Then-President and autocrat Ferdinand Marcos was among the sponsors. The couple had one child, actress KC Concepcion, born in April 1985. In August 1987, Cuneta and Concepcion legally separated, citing irreconcilable differences and bigamy;  Concepcion was already legally married to another woman. Their marriage was annulled in 1993.

Cuneta met politician Francis Pangilinan at her brother's wedding. The two began dating in 1994 and married on April 28, 1996. In 1997, Cuneta, her daughter KC, and Pangilinan moved to Boston, where Cuneta completed her major in business while her husband finished his post-graduate studies at Harvard University. Pangilinan has since adopted KC. Aside from KC, Cuneta and Pangilinan have two daughters, including singer-songwriter Kakie, and one adopted son. Cuneta and her daughter KC maintain their legal residency in the United States, currently based in Los Angeles.

Other ventures

Endorsements
Cuneta is the most expensive and effective product endorser in the country.

McDonald's, Coca-Cola, Lux, Selecta, Sunsilk, Globe Telecom, pH Care, Lucky Me, SuperFerry, Alaska Milk, Colgate, Nestlé, Smart Communications and Tempra were some of the products that made Cuneta a notable ambassador. At one time, Cuneta was earning 8 million to 15 million Philippine Pesos per product endorsed.

Sharon at Home magazine
Cuneta has also released her own lifestyle magazine, Sharon at Home, published by ABS-CBN Publishing Inc. It features a different side of the multi-awarded singer, actress, and TV host. She serves as the magazine's editor-in-chief and for the maiden issue, she welcomes readers into her home with advice and tips.

Real estate enterprises and other business ventures
Cuneta owns a residential project of six high-quality exclusive four-storey townhouses at No. 74 Scout Rallos, Quezon City, near trendy restaurants in the area and within walking distance to and from Tomas Morato and Timog Avenues.

Aside from residential real estate enterprises, Cuneta and Pangilinan own a three-hectare farm called Sweet Spring Country Farm in the uplands of Alfonso, Cavite.

Filmography

Discography

Television
 1979–1980 Call Us Two for Entertainment
 1979–1985 GMA Supershow
 1983–1984 Eat Bulaga!
 1986–1997 The Sharon Cuneta Show
 1997 The Sharon Cuneta Christmas Special: I'll Be Home For Christmas
 1998–20042006–2010 Sharon
 2010 Star Power: Sharon's Search For The Next Female Superstar
 2010 Sharon at Home
 2011 The Biggest Loser: Pinoy Edition
 2012–2013 Sharon: Kasama Mo, Kapatid
 2013 Pinoy Explorer
 2013–2014 Madam ChairmanThe Mega and the Songwriter
 2015, 2021 Your Face Sounds Familiar
 2015–present ASAP
 2016 The Voice Kids
 2017 The Voice Teens
 2017, 2018 Your Face Sounds Familiar Kids
2021–2022 FPJ's Ang Probinsyano

Honors 
“Sharon is the first Filipina artist to sell out at the Los Angeles Shrine Auditorium, first in 1988 and again at her latest June 11, 2005, concert. Her poster is enshrined in The Shrine’s Hall of Fame next to stars Michael Jackson, Barbra Streisand and the Ballet Folklorico de Mexico. She created a traffic jam in the '80s that puzzled the former Mayor of Los Angeles Tom Bradley. After hearing of her success, the mayor attended the concert and awarded Sharon with an Honorary Key to the City of Los Angeles, says Artistopia.com 

Sharon Cuneta was an "Ulirang Ina" and a Hallmark Channel Woman Achiever awardee in 2001. In 2002, she was one of the youngest honorees in the "Patnubay ng Sining at Kalinangan (for Cinema)", given by the City of Manila. In 2004 she was named one of the "Philippines' 15 Best Actresses of All Time" by the Directors’ Guild of the Philippines, Inc. (DGPI)  In the same year, she was also named "Most Effective Product Endorser" because of her credibility by the A.C. Nielsen, a top-rated survey group in the Philippines.

In December 2004, Sharon Cuneta was the first in her category (“Arts/Movies”) to be awarded the highly prestigious TOYM or "The Outstanding Young Men" award, presented to her by then-President Gloria Macapagal-Arroyo.

Cuneta is the first recipient of the Myx Magna Award in 2006 as a music icon with an exemplary contribution to Philippine music. She was the recipient of the OPM Lifetime Achievement Award at the MOR Pinoy Music Awards in 2015. On April 26, 2015, Cuneta received the Dolphy Lifetime Achievement Award at the 6th Golden Screen Awards.

In 2017, Sharon Cuneta was elevated to the Makabata Hall of Fame of the ANAK TV Awards for being voted as Makabata Stars for seven years.

In 2018, she received the History Maker Award 2018 from A+E Networks Asia which honors Filipinos who have had a significant impact on the nation's life and culture.

Cuneta was the first recipient of the VIVA Icon Award at the Viva Convention in 2019 for her invaluable contribution to television, film, recording and concerts.

Awards and nominations

Television 
“The Sharon Cuneta Show” also known as TSCS, the Sunday night musical variety show had a two-year run in another network before moving to ABS-CBN on March 6, 1988. It ran until June 15, 1997, and was awarded as Best Musical Variety Show by the PMPC Star Awards for Television in 1993. Sharon Cuneta was also lauded for being the Best Female TV Host by the same award-giving body in 1990 and, consecutively, from 1993 to 1996. TSCS was directed by Bert de Leon.

In 2007, the “Sharon” show won Best Entertainment Program by the Catholic Mass Media Awards as well as being “Highly Commended” in the Asian TV Awards.

“Sharon” on ABS-CBN won for “Best Celebrity Talk Show” from the Gawad Tanglaw Awards in 2009.

References

External links
 

1966 births
Filipino film actresses
Filipino television actresses
Filipino child actresses
Filipino child singers
Filipino women pop singers
Filipino Protestants
Living people
Pangilinan family
Sotto family
People from Pasay
Filipino expatriates in the United States
Filipino people of Kapampangan descent
Filipino people of Spanish descent
Filipino people of American descent
Filipino television talk show hosts
Filipino women comedians
Manila sound musicians
20th-century Filipino actresses
21st-century Filipino actresses
21st-century Filipino women singers
People from Makati
Intercontinental Broadcasting Corporation personalities
TV5 (Philippine TV network) personalities
GMA Network personalities
ABS-CBN personalities
Viva Artists Agency
Star Music artists
Viva Records (Philippines) artists
Sony Music Philippines artists
Vicor Music artists